Treasure Island Media (also known as TIM) is a U.S. gay pornographic studio founded in 1998 by Paul Morris  that primarily produces bareback films. It was the first commercial producer to specialize in bareback films as part of the emerging 1990s underground interest in the pre-condom era of gay porn that was concerned with the freedom of the sexual experience. The studio is named after Morris's favorite childhood book, Treasure Island. In addition to the original San Francisco office, TIM has production offices in New York, London and Mexico City.

Motivation
Morris said Treasure Island Media was established for "preserving the integrity of pornography and the honest representation of male sexual behavior. When I started producing porn, the genre had become depressingly corrupt, representing only a small subset of sexual behaviors [...] I wanted to capture the kind of sex that has meaning for me and I wanted to do so as accurately and honestly as possible. I also wanted to document the men. I wasn't interested in what they looked like, I was interested in what they understood regarding the complex behavioral language of sex among men." He added, "Most recently, I've been motivated to produce pornography to directly address the appalling phenomenon of the HIV 'closet'."

Sales and popularity
According to XBiz, TIM's best selling video to date is Dawson's 20 Load Weekend (2004), which stars Dawson.

Controversy and criticism
Treasure Island Media has been involved in several incidents due to its product line:
2004 – Titan Media banned its performers from signing with Treasure Island Media.
October 2007 – TIM won the prize for "Best US Studio" at the David Awards in Berlin, the gay European equivalent of the GAYVN, which prompted Titan Media founder and CEO, Bruce Cam, to decline his award.
July 2009 – TIM issued a press release announcing they had been banned from officially participating in Folsom Street Fair, Folsom North, Dore Alley, Gay Erotic Expo and International Mr. Leather.
2009 – The GAYVN Awards placed a lifetime ban on Treasure Island Media productions from eligibility as well as other productions depicting barebacking.
December 2010 – the California Occupational Safety and Health Administration fined Treasure Island Media $21,000 for exposing employees (i.e. the models) to "semen and other potentially infectious materials".
September 25, 2011 – The studio's booth at the Folsom Street Fair was shut down by the San Francisco Police Department (SFPD).
August 2012 – TIM releases Slammed, which depicts men engaging in bareback sex after injecting crystal meth.
November 2012 – The safe sex advocate Colby Keller performed for TIM.
2014 – Morris directs Viral Loads, a video centered on bareback sex between HIV-positive and HIV-negative men.

The AIDS Healthcare Foundation tried several times to have California's Department of Industrial Relations, Division of Occupational Safety and Health's Appeals Board force companies in the pornography industry to treat actors and actresses as employees subject to occupational safety and health regulation; in a 2014 case brought against Treasure Island Media an administrative judge found that the company did have to comply with regulations.

Awards and nominations
 2008 Golden Dickie Awards (from Rad Video): Best Studio, Best Movie (What I Can't See 2); Best Director (Paul Morris); Best Performer Top (Jesse O'Toole); and Best Specialty/Fetish Movie (Damon Blows America 8 – Los Angeles)
 2010 Cybersocket Web Awards: Best New Site; Best Video Company; Best VOD Site; and Movie of the Year
2012 Raven's Eden Awards: Winner - Best Gay Studio 
2013 Raven's Eden Awards: Winner - Best Gay Studio; Best Bareback Movie (Manfuck Manifesto);
2014 Raven's Eden Awards: Winner - Best Gay Studio; Best Compilation Movie (Plantin' Seed Anthology)
2015 Raven's Eden Awards: Winner Best Gay Studio
2015 Prowler Porn Awards: Winner - Best British Scene (Nathan Gets Banged)
2016 Raven's Eden Awards: Winner - Best Gay Studio; Winner - Best Compilation Movie (Legendary Cocksucker: Best of Damon Dogg); Winner - Best Bareback Movie (Buggery)
2017 HustlaBall European Gay Porn Awards: Best Movie Scene (Take That Black Dick White Boy); Best Director (Paul Morris & Max Sohl); Best Fetish Movie (Cum Junkie); Best Movie (Cum Junkie)
2017 Prowler Porn Awards: Winner -Best British Fetish DVD (Public Meat)
2018 Prowler Porn Awards: Winner - Best European Director (Paul Stag); Winner - Best European Fetish DVD (Destroying Logan Moore)
2018 Hustlaball European Porn Awards: Nominee - Best Website, Winner - Best Hunk Movie (Destroying Logan Moore); Winner - Best Fetish Movie (Destroying Logan Moore)
2019 Prowler European Porn Awards: Nominee - Best European DVD (Destroying Logan Moore); Winner - Lifetime Achievement Award (Paul Stag; director & head of European production)

Performer exclusives
B.J. Slater
Max Sohl
Drew Sebastian
John Dahl
Ethan Wolfe

References

External links
 
 Thanki, D. & Frederick, B. (2016). 'Social media and drug markets', The internet and drug markets (European Monitoring Centre for Drugs and Drug Addiction: Insights 21), Publications Office of the European Union, Luxembourg.
 

American gay pornographic film studios
Pornography in San Francisco
Entertainment companies based in California
Companies based in San Francisco
American companies established in 1998
Entertainment companies established in 1998
Mass media companies established in 1998
1998 establishments in California
Cinema of the San Francisco Bay Area